Clash of the Choirs is a reality talent contest miniseries that debuted on NBC in the United States on December 17, 2007.  There were four episodes scheduled in the “quick competition”.  Maria Menounos is the host of the program, which was performed live from Stage One at Steiner Studios in Brooklyn, New York.

The format was developed by Friday TV from an idea from the Swedish singer and choir leader Caroline af Ugglas. Seven seasons of the Swedish version, Körslaget, have been broadcast on TV4 in 2008-2013.

The format was a multi-city “bragging rights” competition between 20-person choirs assembled in the hometowns of the recording artists that support them.  In the 2007 competition, the choirs competed for a cash prize of $250,000, backed in part by Sony Pictures in support of its upcoming movie release, First Sunday.  The film, about petty criminals using a choir in a neighborhood church as part of their scheme, was released 11 January 2008, in the United States and Canada and throughout Europe in April 2008.  The prize was in the form of a contribution to a charity active in the artist's hometown.

The choir led by former 98° singer Nick Lachey won the 2007 competition, which was decided by public vote after four nights of live performances.  Patti LaBelle's choir finished second, followed by Blake Shelton's, Michael Bolton's, and Kelly Rowland's.  The remaining teams received $50,000 each of donations, courtesy of General Electric, parent company of network owner NBC Universal.

The miniseries aired right as most US primetime broadcast television series had run out of new episodes mainly due to the Writers Guild of America strike. Airing the week before Christmas song choices reflected a spiritual tone with one critic speculating that Patti LaBelle's choir was sure to win unless “it’s all a little too much ‘church’ for America”.

NBC announced its 2008-2009 schedule on April 2, 2008, and it also confirmed that Clash of the Choirs would not return for another season. A similar group a cappella competition, The Sing-Off, took place in December 2009 with Nick Lachey hosting.

Teams and results

Format
Choir members were selected in open auditions held in each city with the celebrity officiating. After the top twenty singers from each city were selected, they were sent to New York for rehearsals before the live performances began on 17 December 2007.

Each choir performs, under the direction of their celebrity, and then receives comments from the other competing celebrities. The series has been criticized for not having any real tension or the reality show bite of actual judges. The elimination decision is a public vote by phone and online. The choir with the lowest vote total is eliminated the following night.  (In 2007, only the first two nights had eliminations, leading to a "final three.")

As noted, the top prize was a $250,000 donation to the hometown charity.

Season 1

Song list
Each choir performed as part of a multi-choir medley format as well as songs for the finale night of the show (20 December). Of the songs listed below only those performed the first three nights were considered towards the final vote. On the third show (19 December), choirs performed three songs each: one as selected by the producers, then a Christmas carol, then a song in which the celebrity became the lead singer.

Team Rowland
17 December: "Freedom"
18 December: ELIMINATED
Team Bolton
17 December: "Living on a Prayer"
18 December: "Ain't No Mountain High Enough"
19 December: ELIMINATED
Team Shelton
17 December: "Life is a Highway"
18 December: "Takin' It to the Streets"
19 December: "Home," "Joy to the World" (medley of traditional carol and Three Dog Night version), "This Can't Be Good"
Team LaBelle
17 December: "He's Got the Whole World in His Hands"
18 December: "I'll Stand By You"
19 December: "Jesus Take the Wheel," "It's the Most Wonderful Time of the Year," "Somewhere Over the Rainbow"
20 December: "No More Drama," "We Are The Champions"
Team Lachey
17 December: "Unwritten"
18 December: "Friends in Low Places"
19 December: "Flight of the Bumblebee" (only a cappella song in entire competition), "All I Want for Christmas Is You," "What's Left of Me"
20 December: "What A Wonderful World", "Sing a Song"

Reception
Clash was the top rated show on 19 December and had a viewership of 8.3 million (2.4/7) and "remained steady in adults 18-49" according to Nielsen Media Research. The title sequence created by Framework Studio won a Telly Award

U.S. Nielsen Ratings

International versions

Production
Clash of the Choirs was produced by BBC Worldwide America, also responsible for the ABC hit series Dancing with the Stars. The format is distributed by Friday TV, which is owned by the Scandinavian production company Metronome Film & Television.

The first and third episodes were two hours in length.  The second was one hour long, and the finale was also initially scheduled to be an hour.  However, on 20 December 2007, NBC announced it would expand the finale from one to two hours.

Clash of the Choirs now airs on The Gospel Music Channel (GMC).

Sponsors
On the first episode, GE pledged $250,000 to the Disabled American Veterans.  This was announced just before the performance of the Shelton choir, which features two soldiers from the Army base at Fort Sill, Oklahoma. T-Mobile was another sponsor of the miniseries.

See also
 The Sing-Off
 American Idol
 Dancing with the Stars
 America's Got Talent
 So You Think You Can Dance
 Battle of the Choirs, the Australian version of the show.
 Korenslag, the Dutch version of the show.

References

External links
 Official show site at NBC
 "Clash of the Choirs" videos at YouTube
 Nick Lachey's choir videos
 Patti LaBelle's choir videos
 Blake Shelton's choir videos
 Michael Bolton's choir videos
 Kelly Rowland's choir videos

2000s American reality television series
NBC original programming
2007 American television series debuts
2007 American television series endings
American choirs
Television shows set in New York City

pl:Bitwa na głosy